Kaansa, also known as Gan (Gã), is a Gur language of Burkina Faso.

A Latin script orthography with 29 letters (including extended characters) and three diacritics (the language has four tones) was developed beginning in the 1990s with the help of Stuart and Cathie Showalter, an American missionary couple.

References

Gur languages
Languages of Burkina Faso